Stewart Mackie Houston (born 20 August 1949) is a Scottish former football player and coach who played as a left-back. Born in Dunoon, he began his professional career in 1967 with Chelsea, before moving to Brentford and then Manchester United, where he spent seven years. He also made one appearance for the Scotland national team in 1975.

He was George Graham's assistant at Arsenal and caretaker manager after the sackings of Graham and his replacement Bruce Rioch, and later manager of Queens Park Rangers. He then had spells as the first-team coach at Ipswich Town, Tottenham Hotspur and Walsall. Houston later worked as a scout for Arsenal.

Career
A left back, Houston's first professional club was Chelsea, but he failed to break into the first team and only made 14 appearances in five years. He was sold to Brentford in 1972. A year later he signed for Manchester United for £55,000, where he made 250 appearances (plus two as substitute) and scored 16 goals.

While he was at Old Trafford, Houston helped United win the Football League Second Division in 1975 and the 1976–77 FA Cup, although he did not feature in the 1977 FA Cup Final. He joined Sheffield United in 1980, before ending his playing career with Colchester United in 1986. He also played international football for Scotland, making one appearance in 1975 against Denmark.

Houston was assistant manager to George Graham at Arsenal in 1990, and was twice the club's caretaker-manager: first for three months in 1995 after Graham's sacking in February 1995. Houston took his team to the final of the European Cup Winners' Cup, but the Gunners lost to a last-minute goal from Nayim.

Arsenal appointed Bruce Rioch in the summer of 1995, but Houston stayed on as his assistant. Just over a year after his appointment, Rioch was sacked, and Houston was reappointed as caretaker. Arsène Wenger was identified as Rioch's successor in August, but Arsenal were forced to wait as Wenger was contracted to Japanese club Grampus Eight. Houston left Arsenal in mid-September to become manager of Queens Park Rangers, where he appointed Bruce Rioch as his assistant. QPR had just been relegated to the First Division and were aiming for a return to the Premier League. Houston and Rioch were sacked by QPR in November 1997, with the club sitting 13th in the First Division.

Houston then went to Ipswich Town as George Burley's first team coach, but was later reunited with George Graham in March 1999 when Graham appointed him assistant manager at Tottenham Hotspur. Houston was fired two weeks  after Graham was sacked in March 2001. He then spent a brief period as first-team coach of Walsall. Houston also worked as a scout for Arsenal from 2008 to 2020.

Honours

Player
Brentford
 Football League Fourth Division promotion: 1971–72

Manchester United
Football League Second Division: 1974–75

Sheffield United
Football League Fourth Division: 1981–82

Individual
PFA Team of the Year: 1974–75
Football League First Division Manager of the Month: September 1997

References

External links

1949 births
Living people
People from Dunoon
Association football fullbacks
Scottish footballers
Scotland international footballers
Scotland under-23 international footballers
Chelsea F.C. players
Brentford F.C. players
Manchester United F.C. players
Sheffield United F.C. players
Colchester United F.C. players
English Football League players
Scottish football managers
Arsenal F.C. managers
Queens Park Rangers F.C. managers
Premier League managers
English Football League managers
Arsenal F.C. non-playing staff
Plymouth Argyle F.C. non-playing staff
Ipswich Town F.C. non-playing staff
Walsall F.C. non-playing staff
Sportspeople from Argyll and Bute
FA Cup Final players